The Australian ghost shrimp, marine yabby, or ghost nipper (Trypaea australiensis) is a species of ghost shrimp in the family Callianassidae, found in Australia and the Indo-West Pacific region.

They are bio-irrigators and bioturbators in estuarine sediments, and are widely harvested by recreational anglers as fishing bait.

References

Further reading

 

Decapods
Articles created by Qbugbot
Crustaceans described in 1852